The Secretary of State for Levelling Up, Housing and Communities, also referred to as the Levelling Up secretary, is a Secretary of State in the Government of the United Kingdom, and Cabinet minister, responsible for the overall leadership and strategic direction of the Department for Levelling Up, Housing and Communities.

The office holder works alongside the other ministers in the Department. The corresponding shadow minister is the Shadow Secretary of State for Levelling Up, Housing and Communities.

The position is currently held by Michael Gove since 25 October 2022, having previously held the position from September 2021 to July 2022 under Boris Johnson before being dismissed and eventually being reappointed by Rishi Sunak in October 2022.

History 
The Department of Communities and Local Government was created in 2006 by then British prime minister Tony Blair to replace John Prescott's Office of the Deputy Prime Minister, which had taken on the local government and regions portfolios from the defunct Department for Transport, Local Government and the Regions in 2002.

The secretary of state took over the responsibilities of the minister of state for communities and local government. This post, within the Office of the Deputy Prime Minister, was created in 2005, on the transfer of several functions from the deputy prime minister himself.

Prime Minister Boris Johnson renamed the position Secretary of State for Levelling Up, Housing and Communities and gave the Secretary and the Department responsibility for carrying out the promise in the 2019 Conservative Party manifesto of "levelling up".

Responsibilities
Includes investing in local areas to drive growth and create jobs, delivering the homes our country needs, supporting our community and faith groups, and overseeing local government, planning and building safety.

List of secretaries of state and ministers

References

Ministerial offices in the United Kingdom
2006 establishments in the United Kingdom
Housing ministers of the United Kingdom